"The Things That U Do" is the third single taken from DJ Jazzy Jeff & The Fresh Prince's fourth studio album, Homebase. It spent a week at number #43 on the US R&B Chart, though it failed to chart on the Billboard Hot 100.

Track listing
 CD Single
 "The Things That U Do" (Radio Remix) - 3:38
 "The Things That U Do" (Totally Bumpin' Vocal) - 6:13
 "The Things That U Do" (House Mix) - 5:30
 "The Things That U Do" (Underground Mix) - 7:12

 7" Vinyl
 "The Things That U Do" - 3:56
 "The Things That U Do" (House Mix) - 5:30

 12" Vinyl
 "The Things That U Do" (Club Mix) - 6:44
 "The Things That U Do" (Radio Remix) - 3:38
 "The Things That U Do" (Totally Bumpin' Vocal) - 6:13
 "The Things That U Do" (LP Version) - 3:56
 "The Things That U Do" (House Mix) - 5:30
 "The Things That U Do" (Underground Mix) - 7:12
 "Vic's Drum Interlude" - 1:03

References

1991 singles
1991 songs
DJ Jazzy Jeff & The Fresh Prince songs
Songs written by Will Smith
Songs written by DJ Jazzy Jeff
Jive Records singles